Gong Maoxin and Zhang Ze were the defending champions but chose not to defend their title.

Gonçalo Oliveira and Ramkumar Ramanathan won the title after defeating Andrea Vavassori and David Vega Hernández 6–2, 6–4 in the final.

Seeds

Draw

References

External links
 Main draw

Guzzini Challenger - Doubles
2019 Doubles